A Wizard's Guide to Defensive Baking is a 2020 young adult fantasy novel by Ursula Vernon, under her pseudonym T. Kingfisher. It was first published by Argyll Productions.

Synopsis
When teenage bread wizard Mona discovers a corpse in her family's bakery, it triggers a chain of events that leads to her managing the city's defense against military assault, with the aid of animate gingerbread men and her familiar — a sourdough starter.

Reception
A Wizard's Guide to Defensive Baking won the Andre Norton Nebula Award for Middle Grade and Young Adult Fiction for Best Young Adult Novel of 2020, the 2021 Lodestar Award for Best Young Adult Book, the 2021 Locus Award for Best Young Adult Book, the 2021 Dragon Award for Best Young Adult / Middle Grade Novel, and the 2021 Mythopoeic Fantasy Award for Children's Literature.

James Nicoll called it "an entertaining YA diversion that will encourage younger readers to consider just how easily they might be scapegoated by an ambitious politician," and emphasized that he would "enjoy" reading a sequel. Locus commended Vernon's "ability to craft engagingly quirky characters", and her portrayal of "a Pratchettian world where magic makes for a mostly amusing background, except when it doesn't."

References

Andre Norton Award-winning novels
Lodestar Award-winning novels
Works by Ursula Vernon
Self-published books